Elachista scitula is a moth of the family Elachistidae that is endemic to Victoria, Australia.

The forewings of the males are metallic blue basally with shiny dark bronzy brown scales distally. Females have similar forewings but have three bluish white markings. The hindwings of both sexes are dark grey.

References

Moths described in 2011
Endemic fauna of Australia
scitula
Moths of Australia
Taxa named by Lauri Kaila